Grandy's Country Cookin' (shortened to Grandy's) is a homestyle cooking and comfort food restaurant chain based in Nashville, Tennessee.

History
Grandy's was founded in 1972 by Walter E. Johnson and Rex E. Sanders, who became friends while working together as teenagers at a Dallas, Texas cafeteria.  After launching and selling a successful chain of restaurants, the two young men created Grandy's, hoping to combine the efficiency of fast food with the ambiance of a full-service restaurant.

Under the ownership of Saga Foods, Inc. a multi-concept restaurant firm who acquired Grandy's in 1983, Grandy's experienced its greatest growth surge, primarily in the 1980s, having at its zenith almost 200 stores.  A buyout of Saga by Marriott Corporation led to a sell off of the Grandy's chain, along with other concepts owned by Saga, to American Restaurant Group.  In the late 1990s, Grandy's, now over 20 years old, began to close older locations and remote markets that were underperforming. They retreated to the core markets of Texas and Oklahoma with a strong presence in southern Indiana and northern Kentucky.

In 2000, American Restaurant Group sold Grandy's and three other subsidiaries to Spectrum Restaurant Group.

In July 2004, Steve Butts and Brian Bowen left Grandy's, leaving the restaurant chain without an executive to lead the chain. Monty Whitehurst took over, without experience running a restaurant chain. Within 12 months, the chain lost 18 stores and same store sales dropped 32%.  Also under Whitehurst, many of Grandy's locations were exposed on local television stations for failing health inspections. This caused sales to drop and closing a number of units.

Spectrum filed for bankruptcy in 2006 and put Grandy's up for sale. Souper Salad acquired Grandy's in 2007. Souper Salad filed for bankruptcy in 2011.

On December 19, 2011, Grandy's was acquired by Captain D's for an undisclosed amount.

In 2013 several of the restaurants were shut down due to failed health inspections. In September 2016, USRP closed eight stores by not renewing leases that Grandy's, Inc. signed in 1996. 

In 2018, the original chicken restaurant in Denton, Texas that the founders opened and rebranded as the second Grandy's closed. This left the city of Denton without a Grandy's. 

As of May 2019, Grandy's had 38 restaurants, almost half being in the Dallas–Fort Worth metroplex.  In December 2020, the original location in Lewisville, Texas closed, leaving a total of 27 restaurants.  By October 2021, that number had fallen to 24, franchised across six states.

Location states

Texas (15)
Oklahoma (4)
Kentucky (2)
Indiana (1)
New Mexico (1)
Georgia (1)

See also
 List of chicken restaurants

References

External links 

Fast-food chains of the United States
Companies based in Nashville, Tennessee
Regional restaurant chains in the United States
Restaurants established in 1972
Poultry restaurants
Companies that filed for Chapter 11 bankruptcy in 2006
Companies that filed for Chapter 11 bankruptcy in 2011
1983 mergers and acquisitions
2000 mergers and acquisitions
2007 mergers and acquisitions
2011 mergers and acquisitions
1972 establishments in Texas